Suck it Up may refer to:

Film and Television
"Suck It Up", a season 4 episode of Billy the Exterminator
"Suck It Up!", a season 2 episode of Happy Tree Friends

Music

Songs 
"Suck It Up", by Frankie Goes to Hollywood  from Inside the Pleasuredome, 2014
"Suck It Up", by Magnapop from Rubbing Doesn't Help, 1996
"Suck It Up", by She Wants Revenge from Valleyheart, 2011
"Suck It Up", by Bloodsimple from Red Harvest, 2007
"Suck It Up, Princess", by Ten Second Epic from Count Yourself In, 2006
"Suck It Up", by 40 Below Summer from the DVD release of The Last Dance, 2006
"Suck It Up", by Jo Hikk from Ride, 2009
"Suck It Up", by Adam Richman
"Suck It Up", by Jennifer Parkin's project Ayria, from Hearts for Bullets, 2008
"Suck It Up", by Sean Hogan, 2009
"Suck It Up", by Die Warzau from Big Electric Metal Bass Face, 1991
"Suck It Up", by Wesley Geer included in the soundtrack for Madden NFL 2003

Other uses
Suck It Up (novel),  by Brian Meehl, 2008
Suck It Up (film), a 2017 Canadian comedy-drama film
Vacuum Panic, aka Suck It Up, winner of the 2012 British Academy Children's Awards for Young Game Designers: Game Concept